Nick Knatterton is the name of a West German comic strip and the name of its main character, a private detective.

It was initially released in the German magazine Quick.

The visual style of the comics is cartoony, but still realistic enough for the comic to be taken as a (at least mostly) serious detective comic. It is characterised by its unique style of humour, most of which derives from allusions to current political affairs in the Federal Republic of Germany of the 1950s.

Character
The name Nick Knatterton is an allusion to Nick Carter and Nat Pinkerton. His full name is Nikolaus Kuno Freiherr von Knatter. He was born in Kyritz (also called "Kyritz an der Knatter") to Casimir Kuno von Knatter and Corinna Pimpsberg.

Knatterton always dresses in a Sherlock Holmes-style green plaid overcoat and cap, and smokes a pipe.

He is presented as the embodiment of a competent and effective private detective. He is not extraordinarily physically strong (although he keeps in good shape) and does not possess many fancy gadgets, but his mental capabilities, such as his power of deduction, his senses, his memory and knowledge of various topics, are incredibly good, to the point of caricature. As an example, Knatterton was once able to pinpoint his location after being thrown tied and blindfolded into the back of a van, thanks to memorising the entire map of the city and feeling the van's momentum with his body when turning corners.

Plots

Knatterton's cases often involve wealthy aristocratic families with a public image to maintain. Many of the villains are recurring characters and acquainted with Knatterton and his clients, and they're usually good at heart, make up with their victims after being arrested, and everyone is happy at the end.

Female characters are often drawn as bombshells.

A recurring location in the stories is the Alibi Bar, a bar favoured by various shady characters. The handles on the bar's front door are shaped like section signs ("§"). In many stories, Knatterton has found out the real situation and been able to complete his deductions when visiting the Alibi Bar, where he sometimes finds a wealthy family's teenage daughter and the man who stole her jewelry wrapped up in each other's arms.

TV series
Nick Knatterton's adventures were translated into many languages, and a television cartoon series was produced in 1978 by the creator's own studio.  All 15 episodes of the show were created by Slovenian artist Miki Muster and are available on DVD not only in Germany but also dubbed in Finland where it earned a Gold Record in three months. The show is narrated, with the narrator being in fact the only voice actor. Characters merely squeak when they are shown talking, and the narrator then explains what was said. Knatterton himself often voices out the conclusions of his deductions by saying "Conclusion" (German: "(Ich) kombiniere!", literally: "I'm concluding!"), followed by the conclusion itself. This has become a kind of catchphrase for him.

Films
The comic has been adapted into two films:

 Nick Knatterton’s Adventure (1959)
  (2002)

Radio dramas
2007 and 2008 German based Der Audio Verlag published Nick Knatterton radio dramas in German.
 Nick Knatterton – Der indische Diamantenkoffer (March 2007)
 Nick Knatterton – Der Schuß in den künstlichen Hinterkopf (March 2007)
 Nick Knatterton – Die Million im Eimer / Das Geheimnis hinterm Bullauge (February 2008)
 Nick Knatterton – Die Erbschaft in der Krawatte (February 2008)

See also
 German comics

Notes and references

Further reading
 
 

German comic strips
Knatterton, Nick
Knatterton, Nick
Knatterton, Nick
Knatterton, Nick
Sherlock Holmes pastiches
Detective comics
Humor comics
Satirical comics
Metafictional comics
1950 comics debuts
1959 comics endings
Knatterton, Nick
German comics adapted into films
Comics adapted into animated series
Comics adapted into television series
Animated series based on comics
German animated television series
German crime television series
1979 German television series debuts
1981 German television series endings
Television shows based on comic strips
Television shows based on comics
German-language television shows
Das Erste original programming
Comics adapted into radio series
German radio programs
Detective radio shows
Radio programs based on comic strips
2007 radio programme debuts
2008 radio programme endings